The striated softtail (Thripophaga macroura) is a species of bird in the family Furnariidae.
It is endemic to eastern Brazil.

Its natural habitats are subtropical or tropical moist lowland forest and subtropical or tropical moist montane forest. It is threatened by habitat loss.

References

External links
BirdLife Species Factsheet.

striated softtail
Birds of the Atlantic Forest
Endemic birds of Brazil
striated softtail
Taxonomy articles created by Polbot